St. Brendan's is a town in the Canadian province of Newfoundland and Labrador, situated in Shoal Cove (the town's former name) on Cottel Island in Bonavista Bay. Other settlements on the island include Shalloway Cove, Haywards Cove, and Dock Cove. The town had a population of 125 in the Canada 2021 Census. St. Brendan's is inaccessible by road and is served by a daily ferry service from Burnside.

St. Gabriel's All Grade is the only school in the community and in 2018 had only six students.

Demographics 

See also
 Burnside-St. Chads, Newfoundland and Labrador
 List of cities and towns in Newfoundland and Labrador
 Newfoundland outport

References

Towns in Newfoundland and Labrador
Road-inaccessible communities of Newfoundland and Labrador